Boston College is a private research university in Chestnut Hill, Massachusetts USA.

Boston college may refer to several other educational institutions:

Named for Boston, Lincolnshire, UK
Boston College (England)
Boston Grammar School, a state school in England
Boston High School, a state school in England

Named for Boston, Massachusetts, USA
Boston Baptist College, a Baptist bible college in Milton, Massachusetts
Boston College High School, a private Catholic preparatory school 
Boston Conservatory, a music conservatory
Boston Graduate School of Psychoanalysis, a graduate school in Brookline, Massachusetts
Boston University, a private secular university
The Art Institute of Boston, part of Lesley University in Cambridge, Massachusetts
The Boston Architectural College, an architectural college
University of Massachusetts Boston, a public university in the University of Massachusetts system
Urban College of Boston, a junior college

See also
List of colleges and universities in metropolitan Boston